Piedra Volada Falls (Spanish: Cascada de Piedra Volada) is a 453-meter (1485 foot) tall plunge rainy season waterfall in the Barranca Candameña of the Sierra Madre Occidental range in Chihuahua, Mexico.

The English translation of Piedra Volada is "Flying Rock" or "Flying Stone".

Geography
The falls are located in Cañon Candameña, a canyon of the Copper Canyon (Barranca del Cobre) region,  within the Ocampo Municipality of the State of Chihuahua. The head of the canyon is home to Cascada Basaseachi, Mexico's third highest waterfall at 243 meters (800 feet). Piedra Volada is located on the left wall of the canyon 7 km downstream of the head of the canyon.

Piedra Volada Falls are known to flow only during the wet season. The falls may be viewed from a moderate distance from the brink of the canyon near Huahumar. A hiking trail to the pouroff is accessed through private land near the Ejido San Lorenzo, currently an impromptu National Park administered through the National Commission of Protected Natural Areas (CONANP) with admission charge of $62MN.

See also

References

Piedra Volada
Plunge waterfalls
Landforms of Chihuahua (state)
Landforms of the Sierra Madre Occidental